Welford Reservoir is in the English county of Northamptonshire.

Welford Reservoir is the lower of a pair of reservoirs owned by the Canal & River Trust - the other being Sulby Reservoir - that provide water to the summit level of the Grand Union Canal by way of the navigable Welford Arm.

References

External links 

Canal reservoirs in England
Reservoirs in Northamptonshire
West Northamptonshire District